Barbara Womack Webb (born 1956/1957) is an American judge from Arkansas who is an associate justice of the Arkansas Supreme Court.

Education 

Webb received her Bachelor of Arts  from the University of Arkansas in 1979 and her Juris Doctor from the University of Arkansas School of Law in 1982.

Legal career 

She was elected to be the prosecuting attorney of the 7th and 22nd judicial districts of Arkansas. In addition to being a prosecuting attorney she has served on the Arkansas Ethics Commission, Arkansas State Crime Lab Board, Arkansas Coalition for Juvenile Justice, and the U.S. Department of Justice Anti-Terrorism Task Force.

She is a chief law judge for the Arkansas Workers Compensation Commission.

Judicial career 

On December 4, 2018, Webb was appointed by Governor Asa Hutchinson to be a Circuit Judge of Saline County. She was the first woman appointed as a circuit judge in the county. She was appointed to replace Circuit Judge Bobby McCallister and served until December 31, 2018.

On November 8, 2019, Webb filed paperwork to run for a seat on the Arkansas Supreme Court. On March 3, 2020, she was elected to be an associate justice of the Arkansas Supreme Court. defeating Morgan Welch.

Personal life 

She is married to the Chair of the Arkansas Republican Party Doyle Webb.

References

External links 

|-

1950s births
Living people
Year of birth missing (living people)
Place of birth missing (living people)
20th-century American lawyers
21st-century American judges
20th-century American women lawyers
Arkansas lawyers
Arkansas Republicans
Justices of the Arkansas Supreme Court
University of Arkansas alumni
University of Arkansas School of Law alumni
21st-century American women judges